Hans Wilhelm Kirchhof (sometimes Kirchhoff,  — ) was a German Landsknecht, Baroque poet and translator. He left a rich and versatile collection of works. The Ausläufer collections contain sixteen works. His printed and handwritten works number more than sixty.

Selected literary works
 Wendunmut, auch Wendunmuth (1563)
 5 Gelegenhetsschriften traurige und freudige Ereignisse aus dem Leben der hessischen Landgrafenfamilie (1564)
 Militaris Disciplina (1602)
 Schatztruhen
 Kommentarien des Geschichtsschreibers Philipp von Commines
 Hessisches Bühnenspiel vom Bauernkriege (1570)

Online editions
Kirchhof, Hans Wilhelm: Wendunmuth. Darinnen fünff und fünnfzig höflicher, züchtiger ... vollständig digitalisierte Ausgabe (1565) des Wendunmuth der Österreichischen Nationalbibliothek
  (aus Wendunmut: Ein reicher Bauer heiratet zum Adel und andere Schwänke)

References

Sources
 Hermann Oesterley: Kirchhof, Hans Wilhelm. In: Allgemeine Deutsche Biographie (ADB), p.8. Band 16, Duncker & Humblot, Leipzig 1882 (online version)
 Bodo Gotzkowsky: Kirchhof, Hans Wilhelm. In: Neue Deutsche Biographie (NDB), pp.645 f. Band 11, Duncker & Humblot, Berlin 1977  (online version)

German poets
Year of birth uncertain
Year of death unknown
German male poets